Chelsea is a city in Tama County, Iowa, United States. The population was 229 at the 2020 census. The city is located in the Iowa River Valley and has suffered severe damage in several floods.

History
A post office was established as Chelsea in 1862. Chelsea was laid out in 1863, and it was incorporated in 1878. It was named after Chelsea, Massachusetts.

Geography
Set in the floodplain of the Iowa River Valley, Chelsea is surrounded by hills that are partially forested.

Demographics

2010 census
As of the census of 2010, there were 267 people, 94 households, and 60 families living in the city. The racial makeup of the city was 79.0% White, 3.4% Native American, 17.2% from other races, and 0.4% from two or more races. Hispanic or Latino of any race were 34.1% of the population.

There were 94 households, of which 39.4% had children under the age of 18 living with them, 53.2% were married couples living together, 4.3% had a female householder with no husband present, 6.4% had a male householder with no wife present, and 36.2% were non-families. 30.9% of all households were made up of individuals, and 13.8% had someone living alone who was 65 years of age or older. The average household size was 2.84 and the average family size was 3.70.

The median age in the city was 30.8 years. 29.6% of residents were under the age of 18; 12.7% were between the ages of 18 and 24; 25.1% were from 25 to 44; 20.9% were from 45 to 64; and 11.6% were 65 years of age or older. The gender makeup of the city was 51.7% male and 48.3% female.

2000 census
As of the census of 2000, there were 287 people, 98 households, and 70 families living in the city. The racial makeup of the city was 74.56% White, 0.35% Native American, 0.70% Asian, 22.30% from other races, and 2.09% from two or more races. Hispanic or Latino of any race were 31.36% of the population.

There were 98 households, out of which 37.8% had children under the age of 18 living with them, 50.0% were married couples living together, 10.2% had a female householder with no husband present, and 27.6% were non-families. 24.5% of all households were made up of individuals, and 13.3% had someone living alone who was 65 years of age or older. The average household size was 2.93 and the average family size was 3.52.

35.2% are under the age of 18, 7.0% from 18 to 24, 26.1% from 25 to 44, 17.1% from 45 to 64, and 14.6% who were 65 years of age or older. The median age was 33 years. For every 100 females, there were 112.6 males. For every 100 females age 18 and over, there were 113.8 males.

The median income for a household in the city was $30,625, and the median income for a family was $36,750. Males had a median income of $28,854 versus $24,000 for females. The per capita income for the city was $13,608. About 14.1% of families and 19.5% of the population were below the poverty line, including 26.5% of those under the age of eighteen and 4.5% of those 65 or over.

Education
Chelsea is within the South Tama County Community School District.

References

Cities in Iowa
Cities in Tama County, Iowa
1863 establishments in Iowa